Uzbekistan is one of the most successful teams in Asia, and the most successful team in Central Asia, having qualified for every AFC Asian Cup since the fall of the Soviet Union. With a rich history of competing in the tournament, Uzbekistan is often regarded as a top team and a rising contender for the Asian Cup title. Their best performance was a fourth place finish in the 2011 tournament.

Asian Cup record

1996 Asian Cup in the UAE

It was Uzbekistan's first ever appearance in the AFC Asian Cup, since the demise of USSR. In the tournament, although being regarded as the weakest team, Uzbekistan surprised all predictions by defeating China 2–0 right on their opening account. Uzbekistan, however, lost two remaining matches to Japan and Syria, thus had to end up in the group stage. Uzbekistan's maiden victory over China, however, remained as the biggest achievement for Uzbekistan before 2004.

Group C

2000 Asian Cup in Lebanon

Uzbekistan made their second appearance by participating in the 2000 edition held in Lebanon. However, this would have become Uzbekistan's worst performance in their history, drew just one and lost two matches, both were humiliating 1–8 and 0–5 demolitions on the hand of Japan (they already lost 0–4 four years ago) and Saudi Arabia.

Group C

2004 Asian Cup in China

Uzbekistan participated in the Asian Cup 2004 held in China, and it would have marked their historical milestones. The White Wolves was drawn with neighboring Turkic Turkmenistan, and two Arab teams Iraq and Saudi Arabia, the latter was the runners-up last edition. Uzbekistan, however, performed better than expected. Uzbekistan defeated all three teams with the result 1–0, to qualify for the knockout stage first time, and also the only time they topped group with full nine points. The White Wolves had to end their journey after losing to Bahrain in a penalty shootout.

Group C

Quarter-finals

2007 Asian Cup in Indonesia/Malaysia/Thailand/Vietnam

Uzbekistan would have continued their participation by placing themselves in Group C together with host Malaysia, latest runners-up China and giant Iran. Having been drawn into a tough group with only Malaysia as a point basket, very few people expected Uzbekistan to do something but three points. Uzbekistan eventually lost 1–2 in their opening account against Iran, before demolished Malaysia 5–0. However, in the last match against China, Uzbekistan successfully repeated their feat at 1996, this time, in an even more glorious way by crushing China 3–0. This surprising victory enabled Uzbekistan to the quarter-finals twice while eliminated China from the tournament.

In the quarter-finals, Uzbekistan once again lost to another Arab team, this time, to Saudi Arabia, after 90 minutes with a 1–2 loss and had to go home.

Group C

Quarter-finals

2011 Asian Cup in Qatar

Uzbekistan's participation in the 2011 edition was considered as the most successful to date. Placing in group A with host Qatar, old rival China and Kuwait, the Uzbeks showed to be tough when they beat host Qatar 2–0 and Kuwait 2–1. Although could not repeat the feat of four years ago with China when they drew 2–2, Uzbekistan was still able to qualify into the quarter-finals. In there, Uzbekistan for the first time, to win a match in the knockout round, beating another fellow underdog Jordan 2–1. However, Uzbekistan's semi-final match would have turned to be a nightmare when they lost 0–6 to Australia, shattered their dream to go for their maiden final. In the third place match, Uzbekistan continued losing 2–3 to South Korea, and got their best ever position in Asian Cup history: fourth place.

Group A

Quarter-finals

Semi-finals

Third place play-off

2015 Asian Cup in Australia

Their participation in 2015 Asian Cup was not considered to be too successful. Uzbekistan, placed with North Korea, China and Saudi Arabia, was expected to make up into the semi-finals. Uzbekistan, said, needed to play all three matches to secure their ticket to the knockout stage. First, they beat North Korea 1–0 but they lost to China, for the first time in the Asian Cup, 1–2, despite had taken the lead. Uzbekistan had to fight hard to win 3–1 over Saudi Arabia, eventually booked their ticket to the knockout stage facing South Korea.

In the match against North Korea's cousin, South Korea, which was the repeat of third place match before, the Uzbeks were more resilience, and goalkeeper Ignatiy Nesterov had played an astonishing match to keep the match into the extra time. The Koreans proved to be stronger when they scored two goals, effectively eliminated Uzbekistan from the tournament. Ironically, Uzbekistan started by defeating North Korea, and had to end their journey under hand of another Korea, South Korea.

Group B

Quarter-finals

2019 Asian Cup in the UAE

Uzbekistan joined group F with Japan, Oman and 2004 rival, neighboring Turkmenistan. For the Uzbeks, they were looking for their maiden final, and Uzbekistan's successful victory in 2018 AFC U-23 Championship was believed to be the boost for the White Wolves in such a tough group.

Under guidance of Héctor Cúper, who coached Egypt in the 2018 FIFA World Cup, Uzbekistan won against Oman and Turkmenistan, their first two matches, before falling to Japan in the last match that saw Uzbekistan occupied second place in the group. Thus, the defeat to Japan forced Uzbekistan to face Australia, whom they lost disastrously 0–6 eight years ago and also the champions of previous edition. This time, Uzbekistan played better and more organized, thus forcing the match into penalty shootout, but Australia eventually overcame the White Wolves 4–2, thus ended Uzbekistan's campaign in sad note.

Group F

Round of sixteen

References

Countries at the AFC Asian Cup
AFC Cup